Rhachidicola is a genus of fungi in the family Hyponectriaceae.

References

Xylariales